is a Japanese figure skater. She is the 2016 World Junior champion, the 2017 World Junior silver medalist, the 2015–16 Junior Grand Prix Final bronze medalist, and the 2016–17 Japanese Junior National bronze medalist. She is the former junior world record holder for the free program.

Personal life
Marin Honda was born on August 21, 2001, in Kyoto, Japan, the third born of five children. She has an elder brother, Taichi, an elder sister, Maho, and two younger sisters, Miyu and Sara. With the exception of Maho, all of her siblings are figure skaters, and Miyu is also a popular child actress in Japan. Honda previously studied and trained at Kansai University Middle School, which has an ice rink. In 2018, Honda moved to California with her brother, Taichi, to train with Rafael Arutyunyan. Honda is a member of team RF and looks up to 2006 Olympic Champion Shizuka Arakawa. She enrolled in Meiji University's School of Political Science and Economics in spring 2020.

Career

Honda began skating at the age of two after following her older brother, Taichi, into figure skating.

In the 2011–12 season, Honda stood on the podium at four consecutive Japanese Novice Championships, with a gold medal in 2012–13. She was invited to skate in the gala at the World Team Trophy in the same season. She placed 5th at the Japan Junior Championships in 2013–14 and 4th the following season, training at Kansai University Middle School's ice rink. As the silver medalist of the 2014 Japanese novice nationals, she was invited to skate in the gala at the 2014 NHK Trophy. Her Lutz and flip are hindered by hallux valgus.

2015–16 season: World Junior Champion 

Honda debuted on the ISU Junior Grand Prix (JGP) circuit in the 2015–16 season. Ranked first in the short program and fourth in the free skate, she came away with the silver medal at the JGP in Colorado Springs, Colorado, having finished behind Yuna Shiraiwa by a margin of 8.06 points. She won gold at her second JGP event, in Zagreb, Croatia, after placing third in the short and first in the free — outscoring Wakaba Higuchi by 6.16 points. These results qualified her for the 2015–16 JGP Final in Barcelona. In November, Honda placed sixth at the 2015-16 Japanese Junior Championships.

At the 2015–16 JGP Final in Barcelona, Honda won the bronze medal behind Russia's Polina Tsurskaya and Maria Sotskova.

Making her debut at the Japan Championships on the senior level, Honda finished ninth and was named in Japan's team to the 2016 World Junior Championships in Debrecen. Ranked second in the short program and first in the free skate, she was awarded gold in Hungary, ahead of Russia's Maria Sotskova and teammate Wakaba Higuchi.

2016–17 season 

Honda began her season with a gold medal at the 2016 Asian Trophy. She was assigned to the JGP events in Japan and Slovenia. In her first event at JGP Yokohama, she placed fifth in the short program and won the free skate with a junior world record of 128.64 points to place second overall. In her next event at JGP Ljubljana, she won another silver medal, qualifying her for her second JGP Final. However, she withdrew from the Final, citing illness. In November, she won the bronze medal at the Japan Junior National Championships.

She placed fourth overall at her second senior Japan National Championships and was assigned to compete at the 2017 World Junior Championships in Taipei. She ranked second in both segments, setting new personal bests and was awarded the silver medal behind gold medalist Alina Zagitova and ahead of bronze medalist Kaori Sakamoto.  She was invited to skate in the gala at the 2017 World Team Trophy.

2017–18 season: Senior debut 

Honda began her senior debut with a gold medal at the 2017 US Classic in Salt Lake City. She competed in her first team event at Japan Open and won the silver medal with her teammates.

Honda made her senior Grand Prix debut at the 2017 Skate Canada. She was tenth in the short program after falling in her triple Lutz-triple toe combination and popping her planned double Axel into a single but managed to place third in the free skate to place fifth overall. In her next event at the 2017 Cup of China, she placed sixth in the short program and fifth in the free skate to place fifth overall. At the 2017-18 Japan Nationals, she was sixth in the short program and ninth in the free skate, placing seventh overall. She later competed at the 2018 Challenge Cup, where she was eleventh after the short program. She placed second in the free skate, winning the bronze medal.

On March 30th, she announced she was changing coaches to Rafael Arutyunyan and was moving to the US to live and train full-time.

2018–19 season 
Honda began her season in September at 2018 CS Nebelhorn Trophy, where she placed sixth. In October, she competed at her first Grand Prix event of the season, 2018 Skate America, where she was fourth in the short program and placed eighth overall. She then competed at her second Grand Prix event in November, 2018 Internationaux de France, where she placed fourth in the short program and finished sixth overall. At the 2018 Japanese National Championships in December, she was eighteenth after the short program and placed fifteenth overall.

2019–20 season 
Honda began the season at the 2019 CS Nebelhorn Trophy, where she placed fifth.  Initially assigned to only one Grand Prix, Honda was subsequently added to the 2019 Skate Canada International roster following the withdrawal of Mai Mihara.  Whilst travelling from the arena in Kelowna, she and fellow Japanese skater Keiji Tanaka were involved in a car crash. Honda was cleared to compete despite injuries to her right shin and forehead and wore a support brace, saying, "I decided to compete, and I'm going all the way to the end."  Honda was tenth in the short program after doubling a planned triple flip and underrotating the second part of her jump combination but rose to sixth place after skating a stronger free skate with scaled-down content.  She was seventh at the 2019 Cup of China.  She ended the season with an eighth-place finish at the Japanese Championships.

2020–21 season 
Honda withdrew from the Japan Open after dislocating her shoulder.  She competed at Eastern Sectionals, placing tenth. Assigned to the Grand Prix at the 2020 NHK Trophy, she placed ninth. Honda placed tenth at Eastern Sectionals to qualify for the Japan Championships. However, she withdrew from the Championships after collapsing of dizziness before a morning practice at the event.

2021–22 season 
Honda placed twenty-first at the 2021–22 Japan Championships.

2022–23 season 
Honda placed twenty-sixth at the 2022–23 Japan Championships.

Records and achievements
 Set the junior-level ladies record for the free program to 128.64 points at the 2016 JGP Japan on September 11, 2016. Her record was broken at the 2016 JGP Germany by Anastasiia Gubanova (Russia) on October 8, 2016.

Programs

Competitive highlights 

GP: Grand Prix; CS: Challenger Series; JGP: Junior Grand Prix

Detailed results

Senior level 

At team events, medals are awarded for team results only. T – team result. P – personal/individual result.

Junior level 

Small medals for short and free programs awarded only at ISU Championships. Previous ISU world best highlighted in bold. ISU Personal best highlighted in bold.

References

External links

! colspan="3" style="border-top: 5px solid #78FF78;" |Historical World Junior Record Holders (before season 2018–19)

2001 births
Living people
Japanese female single skaters
Sportspeople from Kyoto
World Junior Figure Skating Championships medalists